The Cape Government Railways 0-6-0ST of 1902 was a South African steam locomotive from the pre-Union era in the Cape of Good Hope.

In 1902, two  locomotives entered shunting service at the East London Harbour. They were taken onto the Cape Government Railways roster in 1909 and both were still in service when the South African Railways was established in 1912.

Manufacturer
In 1902, two 0locomotives were delivered from Hunslet Engine Company to the East London Harbour Board, with works numbers 793 and 794, ex works in August and September 1902 respectively. Numbered 1 and 2 with number plates on their tanks and with plates reading "EAST LONDON HARBOUR BOARD" on their cabsides, they were placed in service as harbour shunters at East London Harbour.

Service

Cape Government Railways
In terms of Act 38 of 1908, the Cape Government Railways (CGR) became responsible for the administration of the three major harbours in the Cape of Good Hope with effect from 1 January 1909. Both locomotives were therefore taken onto the CGR roster and renumbered to 1027 and 1028.

South African Railways
When the Union of South Africa was established on 31 May 1910, the three Colonial government railways (CGR, Natal Government Railways and Central South African Railways) were united under a single administration to control and administer the railways, ports and harbours of the Union. Although the South African Railways and Harbours came into existence in 1910, the actual classification and renumbering of all the rolling stock of the three constituent railways were only implemented with effect from 1 January 1912.

In 1912, the two locomotives were considered obsolete, even though they were only ten years old. As obsolete stock, they were renumbered by having the numeral "0" prefixed to their existing numbers. Even so, they remained in service into the 1930s.

Illustration
The main picture and the following illustrate both sides of engine no. 01028 while in South African Railways service.

References

0090
0-6-0ST locomotives
C locomotives
Hunslet locomotives
Cape gauge railway locomotives
Railway locomotives introduced in 1902
1902 in South Africa
Scrapped locomotives